"The Moment" (stylized in capital letters) is a song recorded by Japanese-American singer-songwriter Ai, featuring Japanese rapper Yellow Bucks. Written by Ai and Yellow Bucks, it was released on June 28, 2021 by EMI Records and Universal Music Group.

Background 
Ai previously appeared on producer DJ Ryow's "Never Change" from his 2021 studio album, Still Dreamin'. In mid-June, Ai shared photos of herself in a recording studio on various social media. She officially announced the single on June 21, 2021 and shared an excerpt of the song on her YouTube channel.

Release and promotion 
"The Moment" was released digitally as a single on June 28, 2021. Ai performed the song with Yellow Bucks and DJ Ryow on CDTV, a Japanese TV channel by TBS.

Music video 
A music video for "The Moment" was released on July 5, 2021. Directed by Yue, it starred Ai, Yellow Bucks, DJ Ryow, Riehata, Thelma Aoyama, Luna, Sid, and Tee. Throughout the video, Ai and Yellow Bucks are seen singing and rapping throughout various locations in a city.

Release history

References 

2021 singles
2021 songs
Ai (singer) songs
EMI Records singles
Songs written by Ai (singer)
Song recordings produced by Ai (singer)